Events from the year 1954 in South Korea.

Incumbents
President: Rhee Syng-man 
Vice President: Ham Tae-young
Prime Minister: Paik Too-chin (until 17 June), Pyon Yong-tae (28 June-28 November)

Events

February
 February 16 – After honeymooning with Joe DiMaggio in Japan, actress Marilyn Monroe performs ten USO shows in four days for American soldiers, airmen, Marines and sailors in Korea.

Births

 Hi Kyung Kim.
22 February-Kim Chang-wan
 4 September-Jeon In-kwon
 27 September - Hyun In-taek.
 15 October - Lim Chulwoo.
 3 December - Yang Hee-kyung.
Lee Chang-dong-Korean film director and novelist

See also
List of South Korean films of 1954
Years in Japan
Years in North Korea

References

 
South Korea
Years of the 20th century in South Korea
1950s in South Korea
South Korea